George Montgomery (born April 26, 1962) is an American former professional basketball player. He played basketball at Illinois, and was a second-round draft selection of the Portland Trail Blazers in the 1985 NBA Draft, though he never played in the NBA. He is the biological father of Mavericks center JaVale McGee.

References

External links
College statistics

1962 births
Living people
African-American basketball players
Basketball players from Chicago
American men's basketball players
Power forwards (basketball)
Illinois Fighting Illini men's basketball players
Portland Trail Blazers draft picks
La Crosse Catbirds players
Paris Racing Basket players
BC Andorra players
Expatriate basketball people in Andorra
BCM Gravelines players
Olympique Antibes basketball players
Olimpia de Venado Tuerto basketball players
Limoges CSP players
High school basketball coaches in the United States
American expatriate basketball people in France
American expatriate basketball people in Andorra
American expatriate basketball people in Argentina
21st-century African-American people
20th-century African-American sportspeople